Group A of the 1999 Fed Cup Europe/Africa Zone Group II was one of four pools in the Europe/Africa zone of the 1999 Fed Cup. Five teams competed in a round robin competition, with the top team advancing to Group I for 2000.

Bosnia and Herzegovina vs. Botswana

Madagascar vs. Egypt

Hungary vs. Madagascar

Bosnia and Herzegovina vs. Egypt

Hungary vs. Botswana

Bosnia and Herzegovina vs. Madagascar

Hungary vs. Egypt

Madagascar vs. Botswana

Hungary vs. Bosnia and Herzegovina

Egypt vs. Botswana

  placed first in this group and thus advanced to Group I for 2000, where they placed first overall and thus advanced the 2001 World Group Play-offs.

See also
Fed Cup structure

References

External links
 Fed Cup website

1999 Fed Cup Europe/Africa Zone